You're Awful, I Love You is the second full-length studio album by St. Louis pop punk indie band Ludo and the band's first to be released by Island Records. The title comes from a lyric in their single, "Love Me Dead." The song "Love Me Dead" was featured in a summer 2008 promo for the television series House and also became Ludo's most successful song to date, peaking at #8 on the Billboard Alternative Songs Chart.

Critical reception

IGNs Chad Grischow praised lead singer Andrew Volpe's vocals for being "compelling without becoming theatrical" and the mixture of "poppy hooks and macabre lyrics" throughout the track listing but felt that most of them "fall short with bland verses ("Drunken Lament")" and "a little too much pop gloss ("Mutiny Below")". He concluded that, "You're Awful, I Love You is a solid album of straight-ahead rockers, enhanced by some creepy songwriting and fantastic hooks. Ludo's major label debut hints that they probably have a great album or two in them, if they can overcome their inconsistency. Still, you will not want to turn your back on this one, for a few reasons." AllMusic writer William Ruhlmann felt that the band's lyricism was considerably "dumbed down" from their previous effort, noting how "Topeka" squanders its beginning by having a lack of direction and continuous repetition of said beginning, and highlighting "Go-Getter Greg" for having "enough flair" to come from their first album, concluding that "Those who have never heard Ludo may think You're Awful, I Love You is an efficient work of pop/rock. Those who know better will be disappointed." A writer for Alternative Addiction preferred the "darker themed songs ("Love Me Dead", "Lake Pontchartrain")" over the "really bright, energetic and fun ("Please", "Such As It Ends")" but gave credit to the latter for having a likable charm to them, concluding that the record "brings the band's intelligent and quirky rock to the mainstream, and that's never a bad thing."

Track listing

The album also contains a hidden track in the pregap of the album entitled "Goodbye Bear".

Personnel
Adapted credits from the liner notes of You're Awful, I Love You.

Ludo
Andrew Volpe - Vocals, Guitar
Tim Ferrell - Guitar, Backing vocals
Tim Convy - Moog, Backing vocals
Marshall Fanciullo - Bass guitar, Backing vocals
Matt Palermo - Drums, Backing vocals

Additional musicians
Matt Bowen - Violin ("Streetlights")

Artwork
Marshall Fanciullo - Album art, Original illustrations
Patrick Hegarty - Album art
Jeff Minton - Photos

Production
Matt Wallace - Producer
Marc McClusky, Jason McEntire - Additional recording ("Drunken Lament"), Producer ("Go-Getter Greg")
Paul "Fig" Figueroa, Matt Bowen, Mike Landolt, Rafael Serrano, Miles Wilson - Engineers
Josh Smith, Posie Muliadi - Additional engineers
Mark Needham - Mixing
Will Brierre - Assistant engineer
Brian Gardner - Mastering

References

External links
 Official Website
 Riverfront Times article, 2008-02-20

2008 albums
Albums produced by Matt Wallace
Island Records albums
Ludo (band) albums
Albums recorded at Sound City Studios